Sir Charles Mills, 1st Baronet (23 January 1792 – 4 October 1872) was a British banker and member of the Council of India.

Born at Popes, Hatfield, he was the third son of William Mills, a director of the Honourable East India Company, and the younger brother of John Mills.

Like his father, he was connected with the banking firm of Glyn, Mills and Company, in conjunction with Sir Richard Glyn, 1st Baronet and later his son Lord Wolverton and grandson George Grenfell Glyn.

On 28 August 1822, he was appointed a director of the East India Company, retaining the post until 1858. Upon the liquidation of the company by the Government of India Act 1858, he was appointed to the Council of India, acting as a financial adviser to the Secretary of State for India until resigning in 1868. He was created a baronet, of Hillingdon Court, Middlesex, on 17 November 1868, for his services on the council.

In 1825, he married Emily Cox, daughter of the banker Richard Henry Cox, of Hillingdon House, Middlesex. Sir Charles had Hillingdon Court built nearby to serve as the Mills family home. Their son Charles Henry followed his father into banking and was later raised to the Peerage as Baron Hillingdon. He died in 1872 at Hillingdon Court, having acquired a large estate there.

Arms

References
Citations

Bibliography
 Pearce, Ken. (2007) Hillingdon Village. Stroud: Sutton Publishing 

1792 births
1872 deaths
Baronets in the Baronetage of the United Kingdom
Members of the Council of India
Directors of the British East India Company